Stanley Campbell Lines (13 February 1918 – 10 February 1975) was a Bermudian sprinter. He competed in the men's 100 metres at the 1948 Summer Olympics.

References

1918 births
1975 deaths
Athletes (track and field) at the 1948 Summer Olympics
Bermudian male sprinters
Olympic athletes of Bermuda
Place of birth missing